Little Blitzen River is a  tributary of the Donner und Blitzen River in the U.S. state of Oregon. The Donner und Blitzen River was named by soldiers of German origin and translates as "thunder and lightning". Little Blitzen River brings to mind one of Santa Claus's reindeer.

As part of the Omnibus Oregon Wild and Scenic Rivers Act of 1988, Congress designated "the 12.5-mile segment of the Little Blitzen from its headwaters to its confluence with the South Fork Blitzen" as Wild and Scenic. It is part of the nation's first Great Basin redband trout reserve, established by Congress in 2000. The American Hiking Society has listed Little Blitzen Gorge Trail among its 10 "hidden gems".

Geology
Little Blitzen Gorge, down which the river flows, is one of four huge U-shaped trenches carved by ice on the western face of Steens Mountain during the most recent glacial period. Although its eastern face is almost vertical, its western face slopes more gradually.

Conservation

Much of Little Blitzen's watershed lies within the Steens Mountain Cooperative Management and Protection Area (CMPA), established in 2000 to protect the region's long-term environmental integrity. About  along the top of the mountain are protected as "livestock-free wilderness". The RNA protects terrestrial and aquatic ecosystems as well as individual plant species such as wedgeleaf saxifrage, Steens Mountain whitlow grass, and Davidson's penstemon. The Donner und Blitzen system, including Little Blitzen River, provides habitat for a unique population of Great Basin redband trout, protected in the nation's first-ever redband trout reserve. The reserve consists of "the public land portion of the Donner und Blitzen River and tributaries upstream of its confluence with Fish Creek to the longitudinal extent of current and future redband trout distribution, and the width of the flood-prone area."

Recreation
Little Blitzen River is a National Wild and Scenic River, a designation applied to the Donner und Blitzen River and all of its major tributaries from the headwaters to the southern boundary of the Malheur National Wildlife Refuge near Frenchglen. Recreational opportunities along the river include wildlife watching, camping, fishing, and hiking. The Oregon Department of Fish and Wildlife limits fishing on Little Blitzen to catch-and-release throughout the year.  The American Hiking Society and American Rivers have listed Little Blitzen Gorge Trail, with its wildflowers and waterfalls, among their "Ten Hidden Gems of the National Landscape Conservation System".

See also 
 List of rivers of Oregon

References

External links

Rivers of Oregon
Wild and Scenic Rivers of the United States
Rivers of Harney County, Oregon
Rivers of the Great Basin